Brachmia leucospora is a moth in the family Gelechiidae. It was described by Edward Meyrick in 1938. It is found in the Democratic Republic of Congo (North Kivu).

References

Moths described in 1938
Brachmia
Taxa named by Edward Meyrick
Moths of Africa